The men's 1500 metres at the 2014 IPC Athletics European Championships was held at the Swansea University Stadium from 18–23 August. There were only final events taken place; no heats events were taken place.

Medalists

Results

T11

T13

T20

T38

T52

T54

See also
List of IPC world records in athletics

References

1500 metres
1500 metres at the World Para Athletics European Championships